Justin Lee Tuck (born March 29, 1983) is an American former professional football player who was a defensive end in the National Football League (NFL). He played college football at Notre Dame, and was drafted by the New York Giants in the third round of the 2005 NFL Draft, winning two Super Bowl titles with the team, both against the New England Patriots. He also played for the Oakland Raiders. Tuck graduated from the University of Pennsylvania's Wharton School of Business with an MBA in 2018. He is now an employee of Goldman Sachs.

High school career
Tuck played high school football in Alabama at Central Coosa County. Growing up, Tuck's favorite sport was basketball. Although he began playing football in the seventh grade, Justin only began to take it seriously in his freshman year of high school where he originally started out as a quarterback before changing positions to tight end and defensive end. His accolades include earning Alabama Class 4A Player of the Year as a senior in 2000, as well as lettering in football at both linebacker and tight end. For his career at Central-Coosa, Tuck recorded 492 tackles with 37 sacks, 26 forced fumbles, and 17 fumble recoveries. As a tight end, Tuck had 115 catches for 2,106 yards and 17 touchdowns. Subsequently, Tuck also won two state championships as a member of the high school basketball team.

College career
Tuck received an athletic scholarship to attend the University of Notre Dame, where he played for the Notre Dame Fighting Irish football team from 2001 to 2004.  After redshirting his 2001 freshman year, Tuck played sparingly in his sophomore season. Playing only 180 minutes for the season, Tuck recorded his first collegiate sack against Michigan State. Despite his limited playing time and one start against Rutgers, Tuck was named a third-team freshman All-American by The Sporting News. Tuck increased his production in his final two seasons at Notre Dame. In 2003, he finished the season with 13.5 sacks before suffering a knee injury against Syracuse. Tuck frequently encountered double-team coverage in 2004. Despite a lingering knee problem from the previous season and not playing in Notre Dame's Insight.com Bowl loss to Oregon State, Tuck still finished the season with 47 tackles, six sacks and 14 stops for losses.

Nicknamed The Freak by his teammates for his raw athleticism, Tuck holds several defensive records at Notre Dame. Topping the previous record mark of 22.5 sacks by Kory Minor, Tuck finished his collegiate career with 24.5 sacks. His career 43 tackles for loss and 13.5 sacks in a single season are also school records. He graduated from Notre Dame in May 2005 with a degree in management from the Mendoza College of Business.

Professional career

In the run-up to the 2005 NFL Draft, Tuck also recorded a wind-aided 4.56 in the 40-yard dash as well as a 380-pound bench press, 560-pound squat, and a 336-pound power clean. Pre-draft reports contended that the knee injury would keep teams from taking Tuck in the first round. He was known as "terrific athlete who is a disruptive force up the field. Breaks down well playing with leverage, rarely off his feet and tough to move from his angle of attack," and "an extremely quick and agile player who possesses very good strength for a player of his size."

New York Giants
{{Quote_box|width=40%|align=right |quote=Every defensive end who is going to be picked in the first round is going to be a good pick for whoever they're chosen by, but if I had to tell you what sets me apart, that would be my desire and determination to get better. I know what I need to work on, I know my weaknesses, but I have that work ethic to improve every day. I have that want to be the best player at my position, and I have the belief in myself that one day that will come true.|source= — Justin Tuck, 2005}}

2005 season

Although projected to be a mid-first round pick in the 2005 NFL Draft, Tuck was selected in the third round, 74th overall, by the New York Giants. On July 29, 2005, Tuck signed a four-year $2.36 million contract with the Giants, which included a $737,000 signing bonus.

Tuck's rookie season in the NFL found him behind Pro Bowl defensive ends Michael Strahan and Osi Umenyiora on the New York Giants depth chart, reducing his role to special teams and the first backup at each defensive end position. In total, Tuck played in 14 regular season games with one start and the NFC Wild Card Round. His first career sack came against the Giants' NFC East rival, the Dallas Cowboys, in Week 13.

Tuck finished his rookie season with 33 total tackles, one sack, two passes defended, one forced fumble, and 18 special teams tackles.

2006 season
During his sophomore season in 2006, Tuck was limited to just six games due to an injury suffered on October 23, 2006, in a New York Giants Monday Night Football'' victory over the Dallas Cowboys. On November 17, Tuck underwent successful surgery to repair a Lisfranc injury. The procedure included inserting screws into Tuck's foot. For the 2006 season, Tuck recorded two solo tackles in six games.

2007 season

Despite starting only two games in the 2007 season, Tuck enjoyed his best season to that point, recording 65 tackles, 10 sacks, and two forced fumbles during the regular season. During the season, Tuck spelled both Michael Strahan and Osi Umenyiora at defensive end and on likely passing downs he teamed with Mathias Kiwanuka at defensive tackle (with Strahan and Umenyiora at end) to form a four defensive end pass rush, a scheme defensive coordinator Steve Spagnuolo employed to pressure opponent quarterbacks. On January 18, 2008, Tuck signed a contract extension from the Giants. The five-year, $30 million deal, $16 million of which was guaranteed, included a $9 million signing bonus.

Super Bowl XLII

In front of a record-setting American television audience, Tuck had a spectacular game in Super Bowl XLII by repeatedly pressuring New England Patriots quarterback Tom Brady and recording two sacks and a forced fumble. According to Tuck, he and Brady exchanged playful trash talk during especially physical plays. Due to the game's low score, opinions were heavily waged that Tuck was more deserving of the MVP award than quarterback Eli Manning.

2008 season

On January 17, 2008, Tuck was rewarded with a contract extension with the Giants.
On March 31, 2008, Tuck reported to voluntary off-season conditioning programs administered by the Giants. Prior to the start of Giants mini-camp in May, Tuck and the Giants were invited by President Bush to the White House to honor their victory in Super Bowl XLII. Tuck also took up boxing to improve his hand-eye coordination.

Due to Michael Strahan's retirement, Tuck was promoted to starting defensive end. When asked about the pressure of replacing Strahan, Tuck replied "Pressure? No, I'm smart enough to realize there's only one Strahan and there will always only be one Strahan. I'm not trying to replace Michael Strahan. I'm just trying to fill in and do my best to help this football team win. I'm not pinning that pressure on my back, as far as going out there and getting 22 sacks in a season." But Tuck started his 2008 campaign in Michael Strahan-like fashion by sacking Washington Redskins quarterback Jason Campbell in the first play of the season opener. The Giants went on to defeat their division rivals the Washington Redskins 16–7. Tuck followed his exceptional performance in week one with an outstanding performance against the St. Louis Rams. Tuck finished the game with 2.0 sacks and an interception return for a touchdown in a Giants victory in week two. The interception and touchdown marked the first of Tuck's professional career. The touchdown was his first since his junior season at Notre Dame.

Tuck totaled 66 tackles, 12 sacks, three forced fumbles, two passes deflected, and one interception. Tuck's stellar play in the 2008 season earned him a trip to the Pro Bowl as one of the NFC's starting defensive ends. He was also voted All-Pro for the first time in his career.

2009 season
Tuck and the Giants entered the 2009 season as one of the favorites for the NFC to go the Super Bowl. With the return of teammate Osi Umenyiora, Tuck hoped to see fewer double teams than he did during the end of the 2008 season.

Tuck played very well in the season opener against the Washington Redskins on September 13, 2009. Tuck recorded two tackles for a loss, 1.5 sacks, and a pass deflection, helping the Giants win by a score of 23–17. After the game, Tuck was named NFC Defensive Player of the Week. Tuck sustained an injured left shoulder when he was tripped by a Cowboys' lineman Flozell Adams in September, which affected his play for the rest of the 2009 season. He ended the season with 60 tackles, six sacks, six forced fumbles, and eight pass deflections.

2010 season
Tuck continued to perform at a high level throughout the 2010 season and, along with Osi Umenyiora, proved why New York's pair of defensive ends were among the most feared in the league.

Tuck recorded career highs with 76 total tackles and six forced fumbles. In addition, he finished the season with 11.5 sacks, a half a sack shy of tying his career best 12 sacks from 2008. Tuck's greatest individual efforts came in games against the Chicago Bears and the Philadelphia Eagles. In Week 4, against Chicago, Tuck accounted for three of the defense's 10 total sacks, and had a forced fumble in a game the Giants won 17–3. In Week 15, against Philadelphia, Tuck had 1.5 sacks in a losing effort to the Eagles.

The Giants finished with a 10–6 record and missed the playoffs after losses to the Eagles, who won the NFC East, as well as the eventual Super Bowl Champion Green Bay Packers. He was named to the Pro Bowl. Tuck was ranked 60th by his fellow players in the NFL Top 100 Players of 2011.

2011 season

Tuck battled injuries in the 2011 season. He started in 11 games. He had 26 tackles and five sacks in the regular season. However, in the postseason he played in all four of the Giants games and had 3.5 sacks, two of which came in Super Bowl XLVI. The Giants went on to win Super Bowl XLVI over the New England Patriots. It was Tuck's second Super Bowl ring in five years. Many believed that Tuck was a primary candidate for Super Bowl MVP because of his performance in the game, but quarterback Eli Manning won the MVP just like in Super Bowl XLII. After the game, Tuck joked that Manning "stole my MVP again." Also, Tuck’s multi-sack Super Bowl performance made him the first to ever have multiple multi-sack performances in the Super Bowl. He was ranked 62nd by his fellow players on the NFL Top 100 Players of 2012.

2012 season
In the 2012 season, Tuck appeared in 15 games, of which he started 14. He finished with four sacks, 45 total tackles, and one pass defensed.

2013 season
In Week 13, Tuck earned NFC Defensive Player of the Week for his game against Washington. He had four sacks in the 24–17 victory. In the 2013 season, Tuck appeared in 16 games, of which he started 15. He finished with 11 sacks, 63 total tackles, one interception, three passes defensed, and two forced fumbles.

Oakland Raiders

2014 season

On March 13, 2014, Tuck signed a two-year, $11 million contract with the Oakland Raiders. Tuck said he signed the deal because the deal that the New York Giants offered was "disrespectful." Tuck played in 15 games and recorded five sacks, 43 total tackles, one interceptions, three passes defensed, and two forced fumbles in the 2014 season.

2015 season
On October 15, 2015, Tuck was placed on the team's injured reserve due to a chest injury. He played in five games and recorded one sack, 14 total tackles, and three passes defensed in the 2015 season.

Retirement
Tuck announced his retirement from professional football on February 1, 2016, after 11 seasons. On May 6, 2016, Tuck signed a one-day contract with New York to retire as a Giant.

NFL career statistics

Regular season

Personal life

Tuck's parents are Jimmy Lee and Elaine Tuck.

Tuck is married to Lauran Williamson, who is from Bucks County, Pennsylvania.  She graduated from Notre Dame's Mendoza College of Business in 2005. She played the defensive back position in women's intramural football and wrote for the student newspaper. She began dating Tuck during his junior year.

In 1973, Jimmy Lee Tuck, Justin's father, built - by hand - the home that has housed his wife and eight children.

During his childhood, Justin was nicknamed "He-Man" due to his large stature. He would run through his home yelling catchphrases from Masters of the Universe such as "By the power of Grayskull!" or "I have the power!". During his youth, Tuck frequently attended Elam II Missionary Baptist Church in his native Kellyton, resulting in Justin becoming the congregation's youngest Sunday School instructor. Justin is cousins with current Los Angeles Rams middle linebacker Bobby Wagner, as well as Adalius Thomas, former Baltimore Ravens and New England Patriots linebacker.

After the Giants won Super Bowl XLII, Tuck achieved a new level of celebrity in his native Alabama. "It was interesting when I went home (to Alabama)," Tuck said. "You couldn't go anywhere without people asking for your autograph or telling you congratulations or how proud they were of you and things like that." The newfound celebrity also extended to New York, where Tuck and Giants wide receiver Amani Toomer were honored by Congressman Charles Rangel at the ball field at Harlem River Park on February 20, 2008. The community celebration was in honor of the Giants' Super Bowl XLII victory. Three days later, he and several Giants players were honored as "special guests" during a historic title unification bout in Madison Square Garden between heavyweight boxers Wladimir Klitschko and Sultan Ibragimov.

The following month, Tuck was again honored for his Super Bowl performance. He exchanged a game-worn football jersey for a game-used hockey stick with New York Rangers captain Jaromír Jágr. After only his second ice hockey game, Tuck quipped "I am hooked. It's football on ice." He is a Rangers fan.

Tuck has participated in various philanthropic causes. Tuck and Giants teammate Michael Strahan teamed up with Nike to design their own exclusive pair of sneakers for ID studio in New York City. All proceeds of the sneakers were donated to Nike's Let Me Play global campaign. Tuck was also featured on the second season of "Cake Boss" when he ordered a cake shaped like a billiards table for the first annual celebrity billiards event for his charity "Tuck's Rush for Literacy."

Tuck and his family have been residents of Fort Lee, New Jersey.

He also served on the player engagement board of advisors of the Alliance of American Football in 2018.

References

External links

Notre Dame Fighting Irish bio

1983 births
Living people
African-American players of American football
American football defensive ends
National Conference Pro Bowl players
New York Giants players
Notre Dame Fighting Irish football players
Oakland Raiders players
People from Coosa County, Alabama
People from Fort Lee, New Jersey
Players of American football from Alabama
Wharton School of the University of Pennsylvania alumni
Alliance of American Football executives
21st-century African-American sportspeople
20th-century African-American people